Limo may refer to:

 Limousine, a luxury car
 Limo (woreda), an administrative division in southern Ethiopia
 Limo, Depok, a district of Depok, West Java, Indonesia
 Limo, Les Anglais, Haiti, a village in the Les Anglais commune of Haiti
 LiMo Platform, a mobile phone and device operating system
 LiMo Foundation, the organization that develops the LiMo Platform
 Limo, Ghana, a community in Kumbungu District in the Northern Region of Ghana

People
 Limo (name), a Kalenjin name common in Kenya
 Benjamin Limo (born 1974), Kenyan long-distance runner and 2005 World Champion over 5000 metres
 Felix Limo (born 1980), Kenyan long-distance runner and Chicago and London marathon winner
 Philemon Limo (born 1985), Kenyan long-distance runner competing in 10K races
 Remmy Limo (born 1971), Kenyan triple jumper
 Richard Limo (born 1980, a Kenyan long-distance runner and 2001 World Champion over 5000 metres

See also
Limos, a Greek goddess
The Limo (disambiguation)

Kenyan names